Marie-Thérèse Toyi, from Burundi, is a member of the Pan-African Parliament.

References

Year of birth missing (living people)
Living people
Members of the Pan-African Parliament from Burundi
Burundian women in politics
21st-century women politicians
Women members of the Pan-African Parliament